Charles Draper  may refer to:

 Charles Draper (musician) (1869–1952), British classical clarinetist
 Charles Stark Draper (1901–1987), American scientist and engineer

See also